Abbé Marius Chaîne (10 August 1873 – 19 January 1960) was a French scholar of Ethiopic and Coptic philology.

Life 
Marius Chaîne was born in 1873 in Tarascon, Bouches-du-Rhône. He studied at the School of Higher Studies at the Sorbonne, and the School of the Louvre in Paris. In 1897 he was ordained and joined the Society of Jesus, but abandoned it after World War I.

Chaîne was a professor of Oriental languages at Saint Joseph University, Beirut; the Pontifical Gregorian University, Rome; and the Pontifical Biblical Institute. He penned the article "Ethiopia" for the Catholic Encyclopedia.

He devoted his life to Ethiopic and Coptic philology.

Works 

 1907: Grammaire éthiopienne. Beyrouth: Imprimerie Catholique. Nouvelle édition 1938. (online version at the Internet Archive).
 1909: Apocrypha de B. Maria Virgine. Lipsiae: Harrassowitz.
 1912: Catalogue des manuscrits éthiopiens de la collection d’Abbadie. Paris: Leroux.
 1913: Catalogue des manuscrits éthiopiens de la collection Mondon-Vidailhet. Paris: Leroux.
 1925: La chronologie des temps chrétiens de l'Égypte et de l'Éthiopie. Paris: Geuthner.
 1933: Éléments de grammaire dialectale copte: bohairique, sahidique, achmimique, fayoumique. Paris: Paul Geuthner.
 1938: Notions de langue égyptienne. Paris.
 1955: La proposition nominale dans les dialectes coptes. Paris: A.-Maisonneuve.

References 

 Ficquet, Eloi (2003). "Chaîne, Marius", in: S. Uhlig et al. (eds.), Encyclopaedia Aethiopica Vol. 1: A-C (Wiesbaden: Harrassowitz), p. 709b.
 Guillaumont, A. (1962). "Marius Chaîne, 1873-1960", in: Bulletin de l'Institut Français d'Archéologie Orientale 61, pp. 11–13.
 Trinquet, Joseph (1975-1976). "L'activité scientifique de Marius Chaîne (1873-1960)", in: Parole de l'Orient 6-7, pp. 537–551.

Footnotes 

1873 births
1960 deaths
French orientalists
People from Tarascon
French Jesuits
Former Jesuits
Contributors to the Catholic Encyclopedia